Demarcus Christmas (born July 4, 1995) is an American football defensive end for the Saskatchewan Roughriders of the Canadian Football League (CFL). He played college football at Florida State. He has also been a member of the Seattle Seahawks and Pittsburgh Steelers.

College career
After playing at Manatee High School, Christmas played at Florida State, where he played in 51 games and started 38. He finished his Seminole career with 105 tackles, including 10.5 for loss with 3.5 sacks, 13 pass breakups, two fumble recoveries and one blocked kick. He was named third-team All-ACC after his senior season.

Professional career

Seattle Seahawks
Christmas was drafted by the Seattle Seahawks in the sixth round (209th overall) of the 2019 NFL Draft. He was placed on the reserve/PUP list on August 31, 2019. On September 5, 2020, Christmas was waived by the Seahawks. He was re-signed to the practice squad on September 17. He was released on October 6. He did not make a regular season appearance for the Seahawks.

Pittsburgh Steelers
On November 7, 2020, Christmas was signed to the Pittsburgh Steelers practice squad. On January 14, 2021, Christmas signed a reserve/futures contract with the Steelers. He was waived/injured on July 1, 2021, and reverted to team's injured reserve list on July 6. Christmas did not make a regular season appearance for the Steelers.

Saskatchewan Roughriders 
On May 11, 2022 Christmas signed with the Saskatchewan Roughriders of the Canadian Football League (CFL).

References

External links
Florida State bio

1995 births
Living people
American football defensive linemen
Florida State Seminoles football players
Pittsburgh Steelers players
Players of American football from Florida
Seattle Seahawks players
Sportspeople from Sarasota, Florida